Wayne Groulx (born February 2, 1965) is a Canadian born Austrian former ice hockey centre. During the 1984–85 NHL season, he played one game for the Quebec Nordiques.

Groulx was drafted 172nd overall by the Nordiques in the 1983 NHL Entry Draft and played one game for them during the 1984-85 NHL season. He also played in the International Hockey League for the Muskegon Lumberjacks and in the American Hockey League for the Fredericton Express and Baltimore Skipjacks.  Groulx played in Finland's SM-liiga for KalPa before spending six seasons in Austria, with EHC Lustenau and five seasons with EC Graz.  He represented Austria in the 1992 World Hockey Championship.

Despite three 100-point campaigns with the Ontario Hockey League's Sault Ste. Marie Greyhounds, including winning the Red Tilson Trophy as Most Outstanding Player in 1985, his success never translated beyond the junior level in North America, though he later became a star player in the Austrian Hockey League in the 1990s.

After retiring as a player, Groulx coached the Fort Erie Meteors of the Golden Horseshoe Junior Hockey League.

Career statistics

Regular season and playoffs

International

See also
List of players who played only one game in the NHL

References

External links

1965 births
Austrian ice hockey players
Baltimore Skipjacks players
Canadian ice hockey centres
Fredericton Express players
EC Graz players
Sportspeople from Welland
KalPa players
Living people
Muskegon Lumberjacks players
Quebec Nordiques draft picks
Quebec Nordiques players
Sault Ste. Marie Greyhounds players
Ice hockey people from Ontario
Canadian expatriate ice hockey players in Austria
Canadian expatriate ice hockey players in Finland